Euthynnus lineatus, the black skipjack tuna or black skipjack, is a species of ray-finned bony fish in the family Scombridae. It belongs to the tribe Thunnini, better known as the tunas.

Description
E. lineatus has a total of 10-15 spines in its dorsal fins with the anterior spines of the first dorsal fin being much taller than the middle spines which gives this fin a concave outline. The anal fin has 11 - 12 soft rays and it has a vertebra count of 37. Its body is almost entirely scaleless except for the lateral line and a "corselet", and there is no swim bladder. It is generally iridescent blue in colour with black markings on its back made up of 3 to 5 horizontal stripes, as well as a variable amount of black or dark grey spots above the pelvic fins. Occasional specimens have extensive longitudinal stripes of light grey on their belly while other individuals have few or no such markings.

Distribution
Eastern tropical Pacific from San Simeon, California to northern Peru and the Galápagos Islands.

Fisheries
No targeted fishery exists for this species, though it is taken incidentally in the course of other fishery operations.

Biology
E. lineatus is a pelagic and oceanodromous species which is rarely recorded where the surface temperature falls below . E. lineatus will form multi-species schools with yellowfin tuna and skipjack tuna. It shows opportunistic predatory behaviour, sharing its feeding pattern with other tunas, as well as dolphins and other large predatory fish, with which it also competes.

The spawning of this species has a wide geographical and temporal distribution, and in the eastern tropical Pacific it has been shown to occur over a wide area from coastal to oceanic waters.

References

External links

lineatus
Fish described in 1920